Voroshylovskyi District is an urban district of Donetsk, Ukraine, named after Marshal of the Soviet Union Kliment Yefremovich Voroshilov.

It is the Donetsk's downtown and was created in 1973 after splitting away from the Kalininskyi District, Donetsk.

Places

External links
 Voroshilov Raion at the Mayor of Donetsk website
 Voroshilov Raion at the Uzovka website

Urban districts of Donetsk